A Serrurier truss is used in telescope tube assembly construction. The design was created in 1935 by engineer Mark U. Serrurier when he was working on the Mount Palomar  Hale telescope.  The design solves the problem of truss flexing by supporting the primary objective mirror and the secondary mirror by two sets of opposing trusses before and after the declination pivot. The trusses are designed to have an equal amount of flexure, which allows the optics to stay on a common optical axis. When flexing, the "top" truss resists tension and the "bottom" truss resists compression. This has the effect of keeping the optical elements parallel to each other. The net result is all of the optical elements stay in collimation regardless of the orientation of the telescope.

Some Serrurier truss designs  end the truss members with a short flexible rod creating a more ideal "parallel motion flexure" system, to allow maximum parallelism of optical elements under gravitational load. Since truss members work primarily in tension and compression, there is no appreciable loss of stiffness due to the bending of the end flexures.

Certain designs used by amateur telescope makers, specifically truss tube Dobsonians that use a single truss, are sometimes called "Serrurier truss" designs. These single truss designs are used for their rigidity and do perform the function of keeping the optical elements parallel, but since they lack the opposing truss that keeps optics on the same optical axis they are not technically "Serrurier trusses".

Other examples of Serrurier truss designs:

See also
 List of telescope parts and construction

Footnotes

References
Learner, Richard. "The Legacy of the 200-inch", Sky&Telescope, April 1986, pp. 349–353
Diffrient, Roy. "Flexure of a Serrurier Truss", Sky&Telescope, February 1994, pp. 91–94
astro.caltech.edu - Reflecting Telescopes

Optical telescope components
Articles containing video clips

ja:トラス#セルリエトラス